Trinity was an electoral district in Ontario, Canada, that was represented in the House of Commons of Canada, 1935 to 1988.  It covered a portion of western Toronto, Ontario.  Its name comes from the Trinity–Bellwoods area where Trinity College, Toronto was located.

History

This district was formed in 1933 from portions of Toronto Northwest, Toronto West Centre, and Toronto South ridings.  Its boundaries changed repeatedly over the years; when created, it stretched far north to the edge of the city boundaries.  As this northern portion became more populated, it was split off into other ridings.  Its eastern and western boundaries were fairly consistent, stretching from Bathurst Street in the east to Atlantic Avenue in the West.  In 1987, due to the relative decrease in the population of downtown Toronto compared to other areas, this district was merged with Spadina to form Trinity—Spadina.  Some portions also went to the western riding of Davenport.

Members of Parliament

Trinity elected the following Members of Parliament:

Federal election results

See also 

 List of Canadian federal electoral districts
 Past Canadian electoral districts

External links 

 Website of the Parliament of Canada

Former federal electoral districts of Ontario
Federal electoral districts of Toronto